Quest Red is a British free-to-air television channel in the United Kingdom broadcasting factual, lifestyle, crime and reality programming aimed at a female audience. The channel is operated by Warner Bros. Discovery and runs as a sibling to Discovery's established Freeview channel Quest, launched in 2009.

History

In mid-February 2017, shortly after the completion of an eleventh-hour carriage deal with Sky to retain a presence on the satellite platform for its current and future channels, Discovery Communications head David Zaslav told a corporate conference call that a second Freeview channel, to sit alongside Quest, would launch during 2017.

The following day, more details of the channel were confirmed, including its name and branding (which will include a red version of the Quest 'Q' channel symbol), content (some of which will be shared with sibling channels such as ID and TLC), and launch date of 15 March.

The station will be available as a free-to-air channel on the Freeview platform (and, by extension, to users of the BT and TalkTalk YouView platforms), and on the subscription satellite and cable platforms operated by Sky and Virgin Media UK and Republic of Ireland.

At launch, the channel was, like Quest, encrypted on satellite and thus not available on Freesat. Quest and Quest Red removed their encryption and began broadcasting free-to-air over satellite in June 2017, and were added to the Freesat guide early in July.

A full one-hour timeshifted variant of Quest Red was launched on the Sky platform in tandem with the launch of the principal channel. From 14 June 2017, Quest Red +1 was made available to Freeview users for three hours a day in the early morning, taking over the capacity vacated by the earlier relocation of Quest +1 to a different, longer slot. On 28 November 2017, Quest Red +1 launched on Freesat.

Unlike Sky, Freeview & Freesat, Quest Red +1 is not on Virgin Media

At launch, Quest Red wasn't available to Sky Ireland and Northern Ireland viewers due to a carriage agreement with Raidió Teilifís Éireann that allowed RTÉ One and RTÉ2 to be available on the EPG in Northern Ireland and also that the channel was channel 162 in the British guide. As part of Sky's major EPG reshuffle on 1 May 2018, Quest Red (and +1) became available to both Ireland and Northern Ireland customers, in addition to moving to 149 for Great Britain customers, a slot they acquired from ITV Digital Channels Ltd, who previously had ITVBe on that slot apart from regions where STV is on channel 103.

Launch

Advance listings information indicated that the first programme screened on the channel would be an episode of Homes Under the Hammer. Ahead of broadcast, this was changed: Extreme Couponing, which had initially been due to follow HUtH in the schedule, was brought forward to 10am, with HUtH following at 11am.

A placeholder for Quest Red was made available on the Virgin Media platform early in the morning of 15 March, ahead of the channel's launch; the new channel was added to the Sky programme guide at approximately 10:45am on launch day in Great Britain only, and to Freeview from noon. A number of other changes to services on the Freeview platform were made simultaneously with the addition of Quest Red, including a reduction in the broadcast hours of Quest +1, which also moved down the programme guide to release LCN 38 to Quest Red.

Programming
60 Minute Makover with Peter Andre
Animal Cops
Bondi Vet
Cake Boss
Disappeared
Evil Lives Here
Extreme Couponing
Forbidden: Dying for Love
Ghost Asylum
Jo Frost: Nanny On Tour
Katie Price: My Crazy Life
Long Lost Family US
Gypsy Brides US
Homes Under the Hammer
House of Horrors: Kidnapped
Is O.J. Innocent? The Missing Evidence
Leah Remini: Scientology and the Aftermath
Long Island Medium
Martin Kemp's Detective
My Naked Secret
My 600-lb Life
Nightmare Next Door
The Nolans Go Cruising
Paranormal Lockdown
Salvage Hunters
Say Yes to the Dress
Scorned: Love Kills
Southern Fried Homicide
True Crime with Aphrodite Jones
Vogue Williams Investigates

See also
Quest

References

External links
 Discovery Communications news release on the launch of Quest Red, 2017-02-16

Television channels and stations established in 2017
English-language television stations in the United Kingdom
Warner Bros. Discovery networks
2017 establishments in the United Kingdom
Warner Bros. Discovery EMEA